In enzymology, a ribokinase is an enzyme that catalyzes the chemical reaction

ATP + -ribose ⇌ ADP + -ribose 5-phosphate

Thus, the two substrates of this enzyme are ATP and -ribose, whereas its two products are ADP and -ribose 5-phosphate.

The systematic name of this enzyme class is ATP:-ribose 5-phosphotransferase. Other names in common use include deoxyribokinase, ribokinase (phosphorylating), and -ribokinase.  This enzyme participates in pentose phosphate pathway.
  
Ribokinase (RK) belongs to the phosphofructokinase B (PfkB) family of sugar kinases. Other members of this family (also known as the RK family) include adenosine kinase (AK), inosine-guanosine kinase, fructokinase, and 1-phosphofructokinase. The members of the PfkB/RK family are identified by the presence of three conserved sequence motifs and the enzymatic activity of this family of protein generally shows a dependence on the presence of pentavalent ions. The conserved NXXE motif, which is a distinctive property of the PfkB family of proteins, is involved in pentavalent ion dependency. The structures of RK and several other PfK family of proteins have been determined from a number of organisms. Despite low sequence similarity between AdK and other PfkB family of proteins, these proteins are quite similar at structural levels.

Structural studies

References

Further reading 

 
 

EC 2.7.1
Enzymes of known structure